Selina Akhter Banu is a Bangladesh Awami League politician and the former Member of the Bangladesh Parliament from a reserved seat.

Career
Banu was elected to parliament from reserved seat as a Bangladesh Awami League candidate 30 December 2018.

References

Awami League politicians
Living people
10th Jatiya Sangsad members
Women members of the Jatiya Sangsad
21st-century Bangladeshi women politicians
21st-century Bangladeshi politicians
Year of birth missing (living people)